Mountain song may refer to:

 Shan'ge Chinese mountain song
 Hakka hill song one of the subgenres of the Chinese mountain song
 Mountain Song, composition by composer Ma Sicong
 Mountain Song, composition by composer Ned Rorem
 Mountain Song (film), 2019 Indonesian drama film
 "Mountain Song" (Jane's Addiction song)
 "Mountain Song", song by Ancient Future (group) and Matthew Montfort, 1986
 "Mountain Song", song by The Greatest Show on Earth (band), 1970
 "Mountain Song", song by Joe Satriani from the 2002 album Strange Beautiful Music
 "Climbing Up" (The Mountain Song) Paul Robeson, 1961
 "The Mountain Song", song by John Denver, 1980

See also
Hillsong (disambiguation)